CGP-7930 is a compound used in scientific research which acts as a positive allosteric modulator at the GABAB receptor. It has anxiolytic effects in animal studies, and has a synergistic effect with GABAB agonists such as baclofen and GHB, as well as reducing self-administration of alcoholic drinks and cocaine.

References 

Phenols
Secondary alcohols
GABAB receptor positive allosteric modulators
Tert-butyl compounds